Sachet is a surname. Notable people with the surname include:

 Ameer Sachet (born 1963), Swedish politician
 Donna Sachet, American drag queen, singer, community activist, and writer
 Marie-Hélène Sachet (1922–1986), French botanist